Timocratica grandis is a moth in the family Depressariidae. It was described by Maximilian Perty in 1833. It is found in Brazil (Amazonas), French Guiana and Panama.

References

Moths described in 1833
Timocratica